The Alliance Against the ESM is a political organisation in Germany dedicated to opposing the European Stability Mechanism (ESM).

It was founded in 2012 with the support of ten members of the Bundestag, with five from each of the Christian Democratic Union and Free Democratic Party:

CDU members
 Veronika Bellmann
 Thomas Dörflinger
 Alexander Funk
 Manfred Kolbe
 Klaus-Peter Willsch

FDP members
 Jens Ackermann
 Sylvia Canel
 Lutz Knopek
 Lars Lindemann
 Frank Schäffler

Outside the Bundestag, the Alliance found the support of the German Taxpayers Federation.

Footnotes

External links
  Alliance Against the ESM official website

Euroscepticism in Germany
2012 establishments in Germany
Policy and political reactions to the Eurozone crisis